Joe Tasker may refer to:
Joe Tasker (presenter) (born 1993), social media comedy content creator and children's television presenter
Joe Tasker (1948–1982) British climber, active during the late 1970s and early 1980s